NGC 64 is a barred spiral galaxy discovered by Lewis Swift in 1886, and is located in the Cetus constellation.

References

External links 
 

Barred spiral galaxies
Cetus (constellation)
0064
18861021
Discoveries by Lewis Swift